Persistence Software was an American software company that operated from 1991 to 2004. Persistence developed software for object-relational mapping. The company was founded in 1991 by Derek Henninger, Christopher Keene and Richard Jensen in San Mateo, California, working with Stanford Professors Gio Wiederhold and Arthur M Keller, who was the Chief Technical Advisor.  In 1999, Persistence Software went public on NASDAQ under the ticker symbol PRSW. In 2004, Progress Software bought Persistence for $16 million.

History

Persistence Software started life as a spinoff from Lighthouse Design. As the original NeXTSTEP computer shipped with a relational database and Objective-C, Lighthouse engineers had created a simple mapping utility called Exploder to store objects in a relational database.

The Persistence team worked with Stanford Professors to extend the object-relational mapping technology by adding the concepts of mapping related objects.

Persistence created a series of products that integrated object-to-relational mapping, caching, and cache synchronization with automated cache management.
The products were marketed under the names PowerTier, EdgExtend, and DirectAlert.

Sun Microsystems licensed the Persistence technology in 1998 which was later incorporated into the Enterprise JavaBeans standard.

References

External links
PowerTier overview from ServerWatch. 
PowerTier 6 product review from Java Developer's Journal

Defunct software companies of the United States
Software companies based in California
Defunct companies based in the San Francisco Bay Area
Software companies established in 1991
Software companies disestablished in 2004
1991 establishments in California
2004 disestablishments in California